The Coppename Bridge (Dutch: Coppenamebrug) is a bridge over the Coppename River in Suriname, part of the East-West Link.

The bridge links Jenny in the Coronie District with Boskamp in the Saramacca District. It was opened in 1999, a year before the Jules Wijdenbosch Bridge opened in Paramaribo.

Further upstream there is a second (Bailey) bridge over the Coppename River, near Bitagron, built in the 1970s.

References

Bridges in Suriname
Bridges completed in 1999
1999 establishments in Suriname